The 2022–23 season is the 72nd in the history of Adana Demirspor and their second consecutive season in the top flight. The club are participating in the Süper Lig and the Turkish Cup,

Players

First-team squad

Out on loan

Transfers

Released

Note: Players will join other clubs after being released or terminated from their contract. Only the following clubs are mentioned when that club signed the player in the same transfer window.

Loans in

Loans out

Transfers in

Transfers out

Pre-season and friendlies

Competitions

Overall record

Süper Lig

League table

Results summary

Results by round

Matches 
The league schedule was released on 4 July.

Turkish Cup

Statistics

Appearances and goals

Goalscorers

References 

Adana Demirspor
Adana Demirspor